Michael Vaskivuo (born March 13, 1986) is a Finnish-American former ice hockey left winger. He played four games in Liiga for Sport during the 2016–17 season.

Early life and career
Vaskivuo was born in Helsinki, Finland and grew up in Florida. He holds both Finnish and American citizenship. He made his professional debut with Hokki of Mestis in 2008 before joining the Dayton Gems of the International Hockey League the following year. On June 8, 2011, Vaskivuo signed for the Jacksonville IceMen, but a month later he was traded to the Rapid City Rush. He was then claimed on waivers by the Fort Wayne Komets on March 14, 2012.

On May 14, 2012, Vaskivuo moved to the Ligue Magnus in France to sign for Grenoble-based team Brûleurs de Loups. He then rejoined the Fort Wayne Komets on August 5, 2013 but would later be traded to the Elmira Jackals on January 6, 2014. In June 2014, Vaskivuo returned to Europe to sign for the Aalborg Pirates of Denmark's Metal Ligaen where he scored 23 goals and 42 points in 36 games. On August 17, 2015, he moved to Italy's Serie A with SHC Fassa and managed 25 goals and 55 points in 40 games.

His performances in Denmark and Italy earned him a contract with Finnish Liiga side Sport in May 2016. He played just four games for Sport without scoring a point before moving to HC Thurgau of the Swiss National League B in October 2016. He also played three games for National League A team HC Davos during their playoff run, scoring a goal and an assist.

Vaskivuo returned to North America and to Florida, signing for the ECHL's Orlando Solar Bears on September 29, 2017. It would ultimately be a brief spell with the Solar Bears, playing just nine games for the team. He followed with brief spell with the ECHL's Florida Everblades for three and Brest Albatros Hockey in the French Division 1 for six games before wrapping up the season in the United Kingdom's Elite Ice Hockey League for the Nottingham Panthers.

References

External links

1986 births
Living people
Aalborg Pirates players
American ice hockey left wingers
Brest Albatros Hockey players
Brûleurs de Loups players
HC Davos players
Dayton Gems players
Elmira Jackals (ECHL) players
SHC Fassa players
Finnish ice hockey left wingers
Florida Everblades players
Fort Wayne Komets players
Hokki players
Ice hockey people from Florida
Merrimack Warriors men's ice hockey players
Nottingham Panthers players
Orlando Solar Bears (ECHL) players
Rapid City Rush players
Ice hockey people from Helsinki
HC Thurgau players
Vaasan Sport players
American people of Finnish descent